Pettarra (Basque, /petjara/, from beheretar(ra)* 'lowlander'), was the vernacular name for the area along the lower course of the Saison (French Basque Country), as opposed to the Basabürüa.

It was also known as Barhoue.

Notes 

Alternative place names
Geography of Pyrénées-Atlantiques
Basque history
Basque toponymy